The 660s decade ran from January 1, 660, to December 31, 669.

Significant people

References

Sources